Siege of Musashi-Matsuyama may refer to:

 Siege of Musashi-Matsuyama (1537)
 Siege of Musashi-Matsuyama (1563)